Paul Monaghan is a British Formula One engineer.  He is currently the chief engineer at the Red Bull Racing Formula One team.

Career
Monaghan gained his master's degree in Mechanical Engineering and then began his motorsport career working at McLaren Racing in 1990 starting out in  research and development department before moving to the special projects division. He eventually advanced to the position of data engineer, working alongside David Coulthard.

In 2000, seeking a new challenge, Monaghan joined the Benetton squad, which was in the process of transitioning into the Renault F1 Team. Initially Monaghan worked as a performance engineer but soon after he joined, he took on the role of Race Engineer for Jenson Button. After Button left the team, Monaghan began working with Renault's exciting new prospect Fernando Alonso, engineering the young Spaniard to his first victory in 2003.

After a brief stint at Jordan Grand Prix, Monaghan joined Red Bull Racing at the end of 2005. Monaghan was initially appointed Head of Race Engineering but over time this has transitioned into the role of Chief Engineer, Car Engineering. This role sees him responsible for extracting maximum performance from the team's machinery across a grand prix weekend and turning racing concepts into performance gains.

References

1967 births
Living people
21st-century British engineers
Formula One engineers
Data engineers
Benetton Formula